Lake Yasinski is a lake in Baie-James municipality, Jamésie territory, in Nord-du-Québec, Quebec, Canada.

The primary inflow, at the southwest, is the Iskutawapu Sakahikanistikw River. The primary outflow at the west, is the Maquatua River, which flows to James Bay at the community of Wemindji.

The James Bay Road passes along the northeast shore of the lake and over the Lake Yasinki Culvert, just south of the start of the Trans-Taiga Road.

References

Lakes of Nord-du-Québec